Man in a Landscape may refer to:

 Man in a Landscape (TV series), a Canadian cultural documentary television series
 Man in a Landscape (poetry collection), a poetry collection by Colin Thiele